The Columbia Lions football program is the intercollegiate American football team for Columbia University. The team competes in the NCAA Division I Football Championship Subdivision (FCS) and are members of the Ivy League. The Columbia football team is the third oldest college football program in the United States: Columbia played Rutgers University in the fourth college football game, on November 12, 1870, in New Jersey. It was the first interstate football game. The first three college football games were played between Princeton and Rutgers in 1869 and 1870.  Columbia plays its home games at the 17,000-seat Robert K. Kraft Field at Lawrence A. Wien Stadium in Inwood, Manhattan, the northernmost neighborhood on Manhattan island.

History

Early years (1870–1899)

Some time in early November 1870 – while November 12 is most cited, others claim November 5 or 11th – Columbia's intercollegiate football journey began with a short trip to New Brunswick, New Jersey, to play Rutgers. Columbia lost 3–6 in the first college football game between schools from different states. The school struggled for most of the 19th century. It was not until after the turn of the century that the team would enjoy sustained success.

20th century
The program was much more successful in the first half of the 20th century, and was at times a national power. The 1915 squad went undefeated and untied.
The 1933 Lions won the Rose Bowl, beating Stanford, 7–0. 
Lou Little, who coached the team from 1930 to 1956, was inducted into the College Football Hall of Fame in 1960.

The Streak
Between 1983 and 1988, the team did not have a win in 47 games and lost 44 games in a row, which was the record for the NCAA Football Championship Subdivision until Prairie View A&M broke the record en route to 80 consecutive losses from 1989 to 1998. In the fifth game of the 1983 season, they won 21–18 over Yale. After that game, they did not win a game again for almost five years. The streak began with a tie with Bucknell in the following game, and ending the season with a loss to Holy Cross, a tie with Dartmouth, and losses to Cornell and Brown. The losing streak was so bad, that at one point, when the team came out on the field, the school's band would play the theme to The Mickey Mouse Club rather than their fight song. One notable loss during the streak was in a 1985 game vs. Harvard, where the Lions led 17–0 with 5 minutes left in the 3rd quarter, only to see the Crimson score 7 touchdowns in the remaining time to lose 49–17. After their 35th loss, they set the record for the longest Division I losing streak in history (beating Northwestern's 34 game losing streak from 1979 to 1982).

After this game, Larry McElreavy, the coach at the time told reporters, "I'm realistic; there's not a lot of talent here." ESPN rated the 1983–1988 Lions teams at 4th in its list of the top 10 worst college football teams of all time. The streak was broken on October 8, 1988, with a 16–13 victory over archrival Princeton after a missed field goal attempt by the Tigers late in the game. Matthew Fox most notably played on the '88 team. That was the Lions' first victory at Wien Stadium, which was already four years old, having been opened during the streak.

Championships

National championships
The 1875 team was retroactively declared co-national champion by Parke H. Davis, along with Harvard and Princeton. The school claims a national champsionship in both 1875 and 1933.

Conference championships 
The Lions have just one Ivy League conference title, which they won in 1961, sharing it with Harvard.

Bowl games
Columbia has made one bowl appearance, garnering a record of 1–0.

Rivalries

Cornell

The Columbia Lions and the Cornell Big Red, the only two Ivy League teams in New York State, have met 103 times since 1889. They dedicated the Empire State Bowl in 2010. Cornell leads the series 65-37-3. Beginning in 2018, the teams will meet on the final weekend of the Ivy League season.

Fordham

The Columbia Lions and the Fordham Rams, the two biggest Division I programs in New York City (Wagner also has a D-I football team) had met 24 times between 1890 and 2015. They dedicated the Liberty Cup after the attacks of Sept. 11, 2001. Columbia discontinued the series in 2015. The series was tied 12–12.

Georgetown
The Columbia Lions and the Georgetown Hoyas have met 9 times. The cup was established in 2015 and is named after Lou Little, who coached at both schools. Columbia is 6-3 against Georgetown and 4-3 since the inception of the Lou Little Cup.

Notable players and coaches
Pro Football Hall of Famer Sid Luckman played his college ball at Columbia, graduating in 1938. Luckman is also in the College Football Hall of Fame. Other Lions to have success in the NFL include offensive lineman George Starke, the Washington Redskins' "Head Hog," during the 1970s and 1980s, quarterback John Witkowski in the 1980s, and defensive lineman Marcellus Wiley in the 1990s. One famous Lion that had limited success on the field but more success in life was writer Jack Kerouac left school and went on the road after one injury-marred season as running back at Columbia. Another Lions back who became legendary for his accomplishments off the gridiron was baseball great Lou Gehrig, who was a two-sport star at Columbia.

Pro Football Hall of Fame members

College Football Hall of Fame members

Notable alumni

 Jeff Adams
 William V. Campbell
 Steve Cargile
 Eddie Collins
 Tad Crawford
 Brian Dennehy
 Marty Domres
 "Wild Bill" Donovan
 Jason Garrett
 John Garrett
 Lou Gehrig
 Paul Governali
 Ed Harris
 Eric Holder
 Matt Kaplan
 Jack Kerouac
 Walter Koppisch
 Sid Luckman
 Josh Martin
 Cliff Montgomery
 Bill Morley
 Cameron Nizialek
 Jeff Otis
 Michael Quarshie
 George Starke
 Harold Weekes
 Marcellus Wiley
 John Witkowski
 Vinnie Yablonski
 Sean Brackett
 Parker Tobia
 Neil Schuster

References

External links

 

 
American football teams established in 1870
1870 establishments in New York (state)